Impossible Pictures Ltd. is a London-based independent TV production company founded in 2002 by Tim Haines, creator of Walking with Dinosaurs, and Jasper James.

Impossible Pictures began by producing documentary series using computer generated imagery with shows like Walking with Dinosaurs, Walking with Beasts and Space Odyssey to docu-dramas such as Perfect Disaster and Blitz Street to drama in the form of Primeval and Sinbad. Two further production houses are also part of Impossible Pictures Ltd. These are 360production, with its offices in Derry, Northern Ireland and Firestep, an animation company trading as Impossible Kids that works out of Manchester.

Productions have  aired  on UK networks including BBC,  ITV, Sky TV and Watch, and overseas.

List of productions

While part of BBC
 Walking with Dinosaurs (1999)
 The Ballad of Big Al (2001)
 Walking with Beasts (2001)
 The Lost World (2001)

As an Independent Company
 The Giant Claw (2002)
 Land of Giants (2003)
 Sea Monsters (2003)
 The Legend of the Tamworth Two (2003)
 Space Odyssey: Voyage To The Planets (2004)
 T-rex: A Dinosaur in Hollywood (2005)
 Walking with Monsters (2005)
 Pickles: The Dog who Won the World Cup (2006)
 Perfect Disaster (2006)
 Ocean Odyssey (2006)
 Prehistoric Park (2006)
 Frankenstein (2007)
 Primeval (2007-2011)
 Ways To Save The Planet (2009)
 Blitz Street (2010)
 Buzz & Tell (2010)
 Fleabag Monkeyface (2011)
 Sinbad (2012)
 Dragon Wars: Fire & Fury (2012)
 Primeval: New World (2012)
 Human Swarm (2013)
 The Great Martian War (2013)
 Dinosaurs in the Wild (live production) (2017)

Awards

British Academy Television Awards (BAFTAs)
Walking with Dinosaurs: 1999 for Innovation
Walking with Dinosaurs: 1999 for Best Original Television Music 
Walking with Beasts: 2001 for enhancement of linear media
The Giant Claw: 2002 for visual effects

Emmys
Walking with Dinosaurs: 1999-2000 for outstanding animated program
The Ballad of Big Al: 2000-2001 for outstanding animated program
Walking with Beasts: 2001-2002 for outstanding animated program
Chased by Dinosaurs: 2002-2003 for outstanding animated program
Walking with Monsters: 2005-2006 for outstanding animated program

Royal Television Society Awards (RTSs)
Walking with Dinosaurs: 1999 for teamwork
Walking with Beasts Online: 2001 for primary and secondary multimedia and interactive

TV and Radio Industry Award
Walking with Dinosaurs: 2000 for documentary program of the year

Visual Effects Society Awards
Walking with Monsters: 2005 outstanding visual effects in a broadcast miniseries, movie or special

Wildscreens
Sea Monsters: 2003 for animal planet international award for popular broadcast program
The Giant Claw: 2004 for parthenon entertainment award for innovation

Broadcast Film Critics Association Award
Walking with Dinosaurs: 2000 for new program

Peabody Award
Walking with Dinosaurs: 2000

References

External links 
 

Television production companies of the United Kingdom
Companies based in the City of Westminster
Entertainment companies established in 2002
2002 establishments in England
Walking with...